Michael Andrei (born 6 August 1985) is a Romanian-born German volleyball player, who is a member of the German national team and Topvolley Antwerpen. He won the bronze medal at the 2014 World Championship.

Sporting achievements

National team
 2014  FIVB World Championship
 2015  European Games
 2017  European Championship

References

External links
  
 

1985 births
Living people
German men's volleyball players
German people of Romanian descent
Volleyball players at the 2015 European Games
European Games medalists in volleyball
European Games gold medalists for Germany
Sportspeople from Constanța
Romanian emigrants to Germany
Expatriate volleyball players in Belgium